Judo competed in eight different weight classes for men and women at the 2006 Asian Games in Doha, Qatar. All competition was held in the Qatar Sports Club Indoor Hall.

Schedule

Medalists

Men

Women

Medal table

Participating nations
A total of 215 athletes from 35 nations competed in judo at the 2006 Asian Games:

References

External links
 Official website
 

 
Asian Games
2006
2006 Asian Games events
Judo competitions in Qatar